Tatiana Trouvé (born 4 August 1968) is a contemporary Italian visual artist based in Paris who works in large-scale installations, sculptures, and drawings. Trouvé is the recipient of numerous awards including the Paul Ricard Prize (2001), Marcel Duchamp Prize (2007), ACACIA Prize (2014), and Rosa Schapire Kunstpreis (2019). Trouvé has taught at the École nationale supérieure des Beaux-Arts in Paris since 2019.

Early life and education
Born in Cosenza, Italy, to an Italian mother and a French father, Trouvé spent her early childhood in Italy and her adolescence in Dakar, Senegal, where her father taught architecture. 

After studying at the Villa Arson in Nice, France where she graduated in 1989, she spent two years in residence at Atelier 63 in the Netherlands before eventually settling in Paris in 1995. Trouvé worked as a guard at the Centre Pompidou.

Work
Trouvé produces sculptures, drawings, and installations, many of which incorporate architectural interventions. One of her most well known pieces is the project titled Bureau d’Activités Implicites (or Bureau of Implicit Activities) that was produced over the course of ten years from 1997. This piece that took the form of an improvised office environment served as a repository and archive of work that Trouvé was making, or planning to make, as a then-unknown artist. Through the creation of architectural modules, Trouvé constructed an administrative space to house her creative efforts as well as her clerical attempts to adherence to the red-tape of the art world. The administrative module is the most significant of this work, because it regroups all the documents that attest to her life in social and administrative terms (CV, grant applications, cover letters, job applications...)

Since 2005, Trouvé has been constructing maquettes or doll houses which emerge from the universe of "implicit activities", which comprise her series Polders. These maquettes take the form of deserted workplaces, recording studios or unoccupied desks. They represent that which has always been there, waiting to be recuperated or reorganised. Placed on the ground or fixed to the wall, these items adapt themselves to the physical exhibition space, and at the same time they suggest the existence of a different space or environment. These Polders look to occupy the space in order to parasite it. "It is with the goal of reconstructing the spaces in which I had been or in which something happened : reconstructions of space, of memory, in the form of maquettes" – Tatiana Trouvé

In an interview in 2009, Trouvé commented that, "Time is the theme underlying all my work." In that, her work – according to art critic Roberta Smith – synthesizes a wide range of sources, including Richard Artschwager, Reinhard Mucha, Ange Leccia, Eva Hesse, and Damien Hirst.

Recognition
In 2020 Trouvé was awarded France’s Officier de l’Ordre des Arts et des Lettres for her contribution to culture.

Collections
Public and private collections that hold Trouvé's works include Centre Georges Pompidou, Paris; Musée d'Art Moderne de la Ville de Paris; MAMCO, Geneva; François Pinault Foundation, Venice; Fondation Louis Vuitton, Paris; Migros Museum, Zürich; and FWA, Foundation for Women Artists, Antwerp, Belgium.

Art market
Trouvé is represented by Gagosian Gallery, and Galerie Perrotin.

Exhibitions (selected)
 1997: Tatiana Trouvé, Centre national d’art contemporain de la Villa Arson, Nice, France.
2002: Polders, curated by Nicolas Bourriaud and Jérome Sans, Palais de Tokyo, Paris, France.
 2003: Aujourd'hui, hier, ou il y a longtemps, curated by François Poisay, CAPC Musée d'art contemporain de Bordeaux, France.
 2003: Clandestini / Clandestines, curated by Francesco Bonami, 50th Venice Biennale, Venice, Italy.
 2004: Juste assez coupable pour être heureuse, curated by Christian Bernard, Mamco, Geneva, Switzerland.
 2005: Djinns, curated by Sylvie Boulanger, Cneai, Chatou, France.
 2006: Printemps de septembre, curated by Jean-Marc Bustamante and Pascal Pic, Les Abattoirs, Toulouse, France.
 2006: La Force de l'Art, Grand Palais, Paris, France (Ricard Prize).
 2007: Times Snares, Galerie Emmanuel Perrotin, Miami, United States.
2007: Think with the Senses – Feel with the mind, 52nd Biennale de Venice, Arsenale, Venice, Italy.
 2007: Double Bind, curated by Marc-Olivier Wahler, Palais de Tokyo, Paris, France.
 2007: Tatiana Trouvé, curated by Eric Magion, Centre national d'Art contemporain de la Villa Arson, Nice, France.
2008: Density of Time, König Galerie, Berlin, Germany.
 2008: 4 between 3 and 2, curated by Jean-Pierre Boraz, Centre Georges Pompidou, Paris, France (Marcel Duchamp Prize 2007).
 2009: A Stay between Enclosure and Space, Migros Museum, Zurich, Switzerland.
 2010: Il Grande Ritratto, Kunsthaus Graz, Austria.
2010: Tatiana Trouvé, South London Gallery, London, England.
2010: Tatiana Trouvé, Gagosian, New York, NY, United States.
 2011: Éloge du doute, Punta della Dogana, François Pinault Foundation, Venice, Italy.
2013: I cento titoli in 36 524 giorni (The hundred titles in 36,524 days), Gagosian, Rome, Italy.
 2014: L'Écho le plus long (The Longest Echo), MAMCO, Geneva, Switzerland.
 2015: Biennale d'art contemporain de Lyon, Lyon, France.
2015: Studies for Desire Lines, Gagosian, Park and 75, New York, NY, United States.
2015: Desire Lines, Public Art Fund commission. Doris C. Freedman Plaza, Central Park, New York, United States.
2016: From Alexandrinenstrasse to the Unnamed Path, König Galerie, Berlin, Germany.
2016: L’Éclat de L’Absence, Red Brick Museum, Beijing, China.
2017: BIENALSUR, Bienal Internacional de Arte Contemporáneo de América del Sur, Buenos Aires, Argentina.
2017: Yokohama Triennale, Yokohama, Japan.
2017: A Good Neighbor, Istanbul Biennial, Istanbul, Turkey.
2017: Avalanche, Elevation 1049, Gstaad, Switzerland.
2018: The Great Atlas of Disorientation, Petach Tikva Museum of Art, Petach Tikva, Israel.
2018: Le Numerose Irregolaritá, Villa Medici, Rome, Italy.
2018: Tatiana Trouvé, Gagosian, Rome, Italy.
2019: On the Eve of Never Leaving, Gagosian, Beverly Hills, CA, United States.
2021: The Residents, Afterness, Artangel, Orford Ness, Suffolk, UK.
2021: From March to May, Gagosian, New York, NY, United States.
2022: Le grand atlas de la désorientation, Centre Pompidou, Paris, France.

Bibliography 
Criqui, Jean-Pierre and Hoptman, Laura, Tatiana Trouvé. The Great Atlas of Disorientation, Paris: Centre Pompidou, 2022. ISBN 9782844269256

Trouvé, Tatiana. From March to May. New York: Gagosian Gallery, 2021. 

Trouvé, Tatiana. "From March to May" in Brooklyn Rail (September 2021), as part of section "How Long Is Now?" guest edited by Francesca Pietropaolo: https://brooklynrail.org/2021/09/criticspage/From-March-to-May 

Maor, Hadas. Tatiana Trouvé: The Great Atlas of Disorientation. Tel Aviv: Petach Tikva Museum of Art, 2018. 

Trouvé, Tatiana, Katharina Grosse, Chiara Parisi and Cecilia Trombadori. Tatiana Trouvé/Katharina Grosse: le numerose irregolarità. Milan: Electa, 2018. 

Berg, Stephan, Letizia Ragalia, Ellen Seifermann, Barbara Hess, Richard Shusterman, Francesca Pietropaolo, Robert Storr and Stefan Gronert. Tatiana Trouve: I tempi doppi. Köln: Snoeck, 2014. 

Gough, Maria, Tatiana Trouvé and Heike Munder. Tatiana Trouvé. Köln: Walther König, 2011. 

Pakesch, Peter, Adam Budak, Dino Buzzati, Dieter Roelstraete, Pamela M. Lee, Francesca Pietropaolo and Maria Gough. Tatiana Trouvé, Il Grande Ritratto. Köln: Walther König, 2010. 

Storr, Robert, Catherine Millet and Richard Shusterman. Tatiana Trouvé. Köln: Verlag Der Buchhandlung Walther König, 2008. 

During, Élie and Jean-Pierre Bordaz. Tatiana Trouvé: 4 between 3 and 2. Paris: Centre Pompidou, 2008. 

Lamy, Frank. Lapsus. Vitry-sur-Seine, France: Mac/Val, 2007. 

Trouvé, Tatiana and Hans Ulrich Obrist. Djinns. Chatou, France: CNEAI, 2005. 

During, Élie, François Poisay and Maurice Fréchuret. Tatiana Trouvé: Aujourd’hui, hier, ou il y a longtemps. Bordeaux, France : CAPC Musée d'art contemporain, 2003. 

Maraniello, Gianfranco. Tatiana Trouvé: Polders. Paris: Palais de Tokyo, 2002. 

Boyer, Charles-Arthur and Joseph Mouton. Tatiana Trouvé. Nice, France: Villa Arson, 1997.

References

External links
"Tatiana Trouvé" by Kara L. Rooney, The Brooklyn Rail (May 2010)
Interview from Galerie Perrotin site

1968 births
Living people
People from Calabria
People from Cosenza
Italian contemporary artists
20th-century Italian women artists
21st-century Italian women artists
French installation artists
French people of Calabrian descent
20th-century French sculptors
21st-century French sculptors
People of Calabrian descent
20th-century French women artists
21st-century French women artists
 Opening of solo exhibition at Centre Pompidou, Paris on June 7, 2022: https://saywho.fr/evenements/le-centre-pompidou-presente-ses-nouvelles-expositions/